Abdul Ghani Mohamed Yassin is a Malaysian politician. He has been the Member of Sabah State Legislative Assembly for Nabawan since 2020 and was a member of the Dewan Negara from 2018 to 2021. He was sworn in as a Senator in the Dewan Negara Malaysia on January 5, 2018 for the second penggal. In the 2020 Sabah state election, he has successfully won the Nabawan kerusi.

Election result

Honours 
  :
  Officer of the Defender of the Realm (KMN) (2005)
  :
  Commander of the Order of Kinabalu (PGDK) – Datuk

References

21st-century Malaysian politicians
Malaysian Muslims
Place of birth missing (living people)
Independent politicians in Malaysia
Malaysian United Indigenous Party politicians
Former United Malays National Organisation politicians
Members of the Dewan Negara
Members of the Sabah State Legislative Assembly
Living people
Year of birth missing (living people)
Commanders of the Order of Kinabalu
Officers of the Order of the Defender of the Realm